This list contains notable people both born in Kraków and residents of the city, ordered chronologically by year of birth.

Born in Kraków

11th to 18th centuries 
 Ladislaus I of Hungary (ca.1040–1095) King of Hungary from 1077 and King of Croatia from 1091.
 Bolesław III Wrymouth (1086–1138), duke of Poland
 Władysław II the Exile (1105–1159), High Duke of Poland
 Matthew of Kraków (c. 1335–1410), theologian
 Władysław III of Poland (1424–1444), King of Poland.
 Casimir IV Jagiellon (1427–1492), King of Poland
 Vladislaus II of Hungary (1456–1516), King of Bohemia and Hungary
 Hedwig Jagiellon (1457–1502), Duchess of Bavaria
 John I Albert (1459–1501), King of Poland
 Sophia Jagiellon(1464–1512), Margravine of Brandenburg-Ansbach
 Johann V Thurzo (1466–1520), bishop
 Stanislav I Thurzo (1470–1540), bishop
 Stanislaus Hosius (1504–1579), Catholic cardinal.
 Sigismund II Augustus (1520–1572), King of Poland and Grand Duke of Lithuania
 Sophia Jagiellon (1522–1575), Duchess of Brunswick-Lüneburg
 Anna Jagiellon (1523–1596), Queen of Poland
 Hieronim Malecki (1525/1526–1583/1584), theologian
 Catherine Jagiellon (1526–1583), Queen of Sweden
 Rabbi Moses Isserles (1530–1572) an eminent Polish Ashkenazic rabbi.
 Mikołaj Zebrzydowski (1553–1620), noble
 Maharsha (1555–1631), rabbi
 Władysław IV Vasa (1595–1648), King of Poland
 John II Casimir Vasa (1609–1672), King of Poland
 Elazar Rokeach (c. 1665–1742), rabbi
 Theresa Kunegunda Sobieska (1676–1730), Electress of Bavaria and of the Electorate of the Palatinate
 Szymon Czechowicz (1689–1775), painter
 Jonathan Eybeschutz (1690–1764), Talmudist and Kabbalist
 Aleksander Józef Sułkowski (1695–1762), Saxon-Polish general
 Józef Peszka (1767–1831), painter and art professor
 Andrzej Alojzy Ankwicz (1777–1838), archbishop of Lviv and of Prague
 Carl Carl (1787–1854), actor and theatre director
 Henryk Dembiński (1791–1864), engineer, traveler and general
 Franciszek Mirecki (1791–1862), composer, music conductor, and music teacher
 Eduard von Feuchtersleben (1798–1857), mining engineer and writer
 Piotr Michałowski (1800–1855), painter
 Wojciech Stattler (1800–1875), painter and art teacher

19th century

1801 to 1850 
 Karl von Urban (1802–1877), field marshal
 Friedrich Halm (1806–1871), poet, dramatist, and novella writer.
 Józef Kremer (1806–1875), philosopher, aesthetician, historian of art and psychologist
 Ludwik Gorzkowski (1811–1857), politician, physicist and revolutionary activist
 Antoni Kątski (1817–1899), pianist and composer
 Maximilian Cercha (1818–1907), painter and drawer
 Julian Gutowski (1823–1890), Mayor of Nowy Sącz
 Ludwig Burger (1825–1884), historical painter and illustrator
 Karol Estreicher (senior) (1827–1908), bibliographer, librarian, and a founder of the Polish Academy of Learning
 Stanisław Mieroszewski (1827–1900), politician, writer, historian and member of the Imperial Council of Austria
 Władysław Łuszczkiewicz (1828–1900), painter and art historian
 Aleksander Kotsis (1836–1877), painter
 Michał Bałucki (1837–1901), playwright and poet
 Jan Matejko (1838–1893), painter
 Helena Modjeska (1840–1909), actress.
 Anton Rehmann (1840–1917), geographer, geomorphologist, botanist and explorer

1851 to 1900 
 Edmund von Neusser (1852–1912), internist and professor
 Josef Josephi (1852–1920), singer and actor
 Stanisław Tondos (1854–1917), painter
 Eduard Birnbaum (1855–1920), cantor
 Kazimierz Pochwalski (1855–1940), painter
 Jan Drozdowski (1857–1918), pianist and music teacher
 Arthur Giesl von Gieslingen (1857–1935), general officer during the First World War who worked for the Evidenzbureau
 Heinrich Rauchinger (1858–1942), portrait painter and history painter
 Ignaz Sowinski (1858–1917), architect
 Lola Beeth (1861–1940), Austrian operatic soprano
 Adam Maurizio (1862–1941), botanist and specialist of food technology and cultural history
 Olga Boznańska (1865–1940), painter
 Leon Wachholz (1867–1942), scientist and medical examiner
 Sigmund Fraenkel (1868–1939), chemist
 Asriel Günzig (1868–1931), rabbi
 Stanisław Estreicher (1869–1939), historian of Law and politician
 Stanisław Wyspiański (1869–1907), playwright, painter, and poet
 Saul Raphael Landau (1870–1943), lawyer and Jewish publicist
 Heinrich Nebenzahl (1870–1938), film producer
 Henryk Opieński (1870–1942), composer
 Helena Rubinstein (1870–1965), cosmetics entrepreneur and philanthropist
 Lucjan Rydel (1870–1918), poet and playwright
  (1870–1935), politician, journalist and Marxist theorist
 Michał Marian Siedlecki (1873–1940), marine biologist
 Rudolf Maria Holzapfel (1874–1930), psychologist and philosopher
 Rafael Schermann (1874–1943), graphologist and psychic
 Xawery Dunikowski (1875–1964), sculptor and artist
 Władysław Wróblewski (1875–1951),  politician, scientist, diplomat, and lawyer
 Bernard Friedberg (1876–1961), Hebraist, scholar and bibliographer
 Mordechaj Gebirtig (1877–1942), poet and composer
 Archduchess Maria Christina of Austria (1879–1962), Archduchess of Austria
 Adolf Chybiński (1880–1952), historian, musicologist, and academic
 Henryk Grossman (1881–1950), economist, historian, and Marxist revolutionary
 Gustav Adolf Platz (1881–1947), architect
 Max Fleischer (1883–1972), cartoonist and film producer
 Leon Chwistek (1884–1944), painter, theoretician of modern art, literary critic, logician, philosopher, and mathematician
 Bronisław Malinowski (1884–1942), social anthropologist
 Tadeusz Kutrzeba (1885–1947), general in the Polish Army
 Juliusz Osterwa (1885–1947), actor, theatre director, and art theoretician
  (1885–1959), major general and commander of the Theresian Military Academy
 Stefan Bryła (1886–1943), construction engineer and welding pioneer
 Zygmunt Klemensiewicz (1886–1963), physicist, physical chemist, and mountain climber
 Leon Schiller (1887–1954), theatre director and theatre theoretician
  (1888–1964), writer and journalist
  (1888–1937), composer
 Józef Retinger (1888–1960), scholar, international political activist, publicist, and writer
  (1890–1944),  singer
 Henryk Gotlib (1890–1966), painter, sculptor, and writer.dnb
 Josef von Manowarda (1890–1942), operatic singer
 Moise Kisling (1891–1953), painter
 Tadeusz Peiper (1891–1969), poet, art critic, and theoretician of literature
 Stefan Banach (1892–1945), mathematician
 Roman Ingarden (1893–1970), philosopher
 Frank Linke-Crawford (1893–1918), flying ace of the Austro-Hungarian Air Force during World War I.
  (1893–1969), publisher, narrator, and women's rights activist
 Ewa Bandrowska-Turska (1894–1979), opera singer and music educator
 Emil August Fieldorf (1895–1953), deputy commander-in-chief of the Polish Home Army
 Joseph Rosenstock (1895–1985), conductor and composer
  (1896–1962), historian
 Elsa Gasser (1896–1967), Polish-born Swiss economist and businesswoman
 Ferdynand Zweig (1896–1988), economist and sociologist
 Jerzy Adam Brandhuber (1897–1981), painter and survivor of the Auschwitz concentration camp
  (1897–1958), pioneer of the Polish balloon sport
  (1897–1969), social psychologist and sociologist
 Henryk Reyman (1897–1963), football player and football trainer
 Leopold Infeld (1898–1968), physicist
 Rudolph Maté (1898–1964), cinematographer and film director
 Ludwik Gintel (1899–1973), football player
 Leon Kruczkowski (1900–1962), writer
 Leon Sperling (1900–1941), football player

20th century

1901 to 1925 
 Yohanan Bader (1901–1994), Israeli politician
 Gilda Gray (1901–1959), actress and dancer.bnf
 Itzhak Stern (1901–1969), Holocaust survivor
 Alexander Weissberg-Cybulski (1901–1964), physicist, author, and businessman
 Alexander Abusch (1902–1982), journalist, writer, and politician in East Germany
 Paul Rosenstein-Rodan (1902–1985), economist
 Ludwik Gross (1904–1999), oncologist and virologist
  (1905–1973), folk actress
 Wanda Wasilewska (1905–1964), politician and writer
 Karol Estreicher (junior) (1906–1984), professor and historian of art
 Jan Hoffman (1906–1995), pianist and music educator
 Edward Ochab (1906–1989), politician and general
  (1908–2000), engineer, farmer, author and preservationist
 Adam Marczyński (1908–1985), painter
 Yoel Zussman (1910–1982), jurist and judge
 Jadwiga Jędrzejowska (1912–1980), tennis player
 Jerzy Turowicz (1912–1999), journalist and editor
 Jan Ekier (1913–2004), pianist, composer, and music educator
 Poldek Pfefferberg (1913–2001), Holocaust survivor
  (1914–1997), composer and conductor
 Tadeusz Hołuj (1916–1985), writer and survivor of Auschwitz
 Wojciech Żukrowski (1916–2000), writer, poet, essayist, and literary critic
  (1917–1982), pianist and music educator
 Aleksander Kulisiewicz (1918–1982), journalist and singer
  (1918–1997), Israeli diplomat
 Roman Haubenstock-Ramati (1919–1994), music editor and composer
  (1920–2009), ethnographer
 Mietek Pemper (1920–2011), survivor of Krakow-Płaszów concentration camp
  (1921–1997), Evangelical Methodist pastor, chief superintendent of the Evangelical Methodist Church in the People's Republic of Poland, university professor 
 Andrzej Munk (1921–1961), director and cinematographer
  (1921–1945), pilot
 Bogdan Śliwa (1922–2003), chess player
 Gustaw Holoubek (1923–2008), actor, film and theatre director and educator
 Jerzy Nowosielski (1923–2011), painter, graphic artist, and illustrator
 Zofia Posmysz (1923–2022), editor and author
 Gena Turgel (1923–2018), educator, author, and Holocaust survivor
 Piotr Wandycz (1923–2017), Polish-American historian
  (1924–2004), civil engineer
 Wojciech Has (1925–2000), film director

1926 to 1950 

 Edward Mosberg (1926-2022), Polish-American Holocaust survivor, educator, and philanthropist
  (1926–1990), Evangelical Lutheran theologian
 Miriam Akavia (1927–2015), writer and translator
  (1927–2015), German general practitioner, journalist, and Holocaust survivor
 Moshe Taube (1927–2020), cantor, academic, and musician
 Franciszek Macharski (1927–2016), Archbishop of Krakow
 Bernard Offen (born 1929), Holocaust survivor and film producer
  (1930–2013), Jewish contemporary witness of the Holocaust
 Zvi Hecker (born 1931), architect
  (born 1931), Polish American entrepreneur and philanthropist
 Jerzy Hoffman (born 1932), film director
  (born 1932), composer, music teacher, and scholar
  (born 1932), doctor, university lecturer, nonfiction author, and publicist
  (born 1933), pianist and music educator
 Andrzej Trzaskowski (1933–1998), jazz composer and musicologist
 Jerzy Vetulani (1936–2017), biochemist, psychopharmacologist and neuroscientist
 Adam Holender (born 1937), cinematographer
 Zygmunt Konieczny (born 1937), composer
 Andrzej Sariusz-Skąpski (1937–2010), President of the Federation of Katyn Families
 Marek Walczewski (1937–2009), actor
  (born 1938), jazz bassist
 Roma Ligocka (born 1938), costume designer, author, and painter
 Adam Greenberg (born 1939), cinematographer
  (1939–1999), pianist and music educator
 Anna Polony (born 1939), theatre and film actress
 Barbara Buczek (1940–1993), composer, pianist, and music educator
  (born 1940), classical philologist
  (born 1940), writer
 Kazimierz Kaczor (born 1941), actor
 Ewa Demarczyk (born 1941), singer
  (born 1941), politician
 Janusz Muniak (1941–2016), jazz musician
 Ivan Putski (born 1941), professional wrestler and bodybuilder
 Stefan Jerzy Zweig (born 1941), author and cinematographer
 Marek Koterski (born 1942), film director
 Janina Paradowska (1942–2016), journalist
  (born 1942), lawyer and politician
 Krzysztof Meyer (born 1943), composer, pianist, music theorist, and professor
  (born 1943), writer and song poet
 Jerzy Bahr (1944–2016), Ambassador of the Republic of Poland to the Russian Federation
 Ewa Braun (born 1944), Oscar winning set decorator, costume designer, and production designer
  (born 1944), organist and music educator
  (born 1944), ophthalmologist
 Antoni Wit (born 1944), conductor
 Ewa Lipska (born 1945), writer
 Leszek Zadlo (born 1945), jazz musician and university teacher
 Jerzy Zelnik (born 1945), actor
 Robert Gadocha (born 1946), soccer player
  (born 1946), composer and music educator
 Zbigniew Seifert (1946–1979), jazz musician
  (1946–2016), jazz musician
  (1947–2014), jazz musician
 Andrzej Olechowski (born 1947), politician and economist
 Jerzy Stuhr (born 1947), actor and director
 Jan Balachowski (born 1948), sprinter
 Jan Widacki (born 1948), jurisprudence academic, professor, diplomat, and politician
 Andrzej Zaucha (1949–1991), singer
  (born 1949), composer, conductor, violinist, and music educator
 Ryszard Legutko (born 1949), politician
 Zbigniew Wassermann (1949–2010), politician and jurist
 Marek Kondrat (born 1950), actor
  (1950–2017), geoscientist
 Johann Rafelski (born 1950), physicist

1951 to 1975 
 Jan Gmyrek (born 1951), handball player
 Olga Jackowska (1951–2018), singer
 Tadeusz Rutkowski (born 1951), weightlifter
 Jerzy Miller (born 1952), Polish Minister of the Interior
 Ryszard Szeremeta (born 1952), composer, conductor, and jazz singer
  (born 1953), composer, music organiser, and music educator
 Jarek Śmietana (1953–2013), jazz musician
 Bogusław Sonik (born 1953), politician
  (born 1954), draftsman, graphic artist, installation and performance artist
  (born 1954), spokesman for the Roma National Congress
 Róża Thun (born 1954), publicist and Member of the European Parliament
 Zdzisław Kapka (born 1954), football player, football manager, and politician
  (born 1954), mathematician, textbook author, and university professor
 Paul Dembinski (born 1955), economist
  (born 1955), pianist
  (born 1955), composer, double bass player, and gambist
 Daniel Stabrawa (born 1955), violinist and conductor
 Stanisław Żółtek (born 1956), politician
 Adam Nawałka (born 1957), football player
 Krzysztof Włosik (born 1957), archer
 Zbigniew Karkowski (1958–2013), composer and musician
 Piotr Lenar (born 1958), cinematographer
 Andrzej Iwan (born 1959), football player
 Jan Karaś (born 1959), football player and football trainer
 Jan Rokita (born 1959), politician
 Bogdan Klich (born 1960), politician
 Janusz Kurtyka (1960–2010), historian and second president of the Institute of National Remembrance
  (born 1960), Australian software developer, instrument maker, and installation artist
  (born 1960), actor, singer, artist, and cabaret member
 Jarosław Gowin (born 1961), politician and Minister of Justice
 Andrzej Kremer (1961–2010), jurist, diplomat, and Deputy Minister of Foreign Affairs
 Janusz Nawrocki (born 1961), football player
 Piotr Skrobowski (born 1961), football player
 Robert Makłowicz (born 1963), food critic, journalist, historian and television personality
 Marcin Baran (born 1963), poet and editor
 Wiesław Śpiewak (born 1963), Catholic religious priest, Bishop of Hamilton in Bermuda
 Grzegorz Ryś (born 1964), Roman Catholic bishop, Archbishop of Łódź
 Grzegorz Turnau (born 1967), composer, pianist, poet, and singer
 Ewa Drzyzga (born 1967), journalist and TV presenter
  (born 1968), judge at the European Court of Human Rights
 Mirosław Waligóra (born 1970), football player
 Paweł Deląg(born 1970), actor
 Zbigniew Ziobro (born 1970), politician and jurist
 Mikołaj Budzanowski (born 1971), Minister of State Treasury
 Marek Koźmiński (born 1971), football player
  (born 1971), bass guitarist
 Andrzej Duda (born 1972), President of Poland
 Agata Kornhauser-Duda (born 1972), current First Lady of Poland and former teacher
  (born 1972), voice actor, theatre and film actor
 Abel Korzeniowski (born 1972), composer of film and theatre scores
 Maja Ostaszewska (born 1972), actress
 Tomasz Rząsa (born 1973), football player
 Małgorzata Szumowska (born 1973), film director
 Jadwiga Emilewicz (born 1974), Deputy Prime Minister of Poland
 Dorota Siudek (born 1975), football player
 Maciej Stuhr (born 1975), actor, comedian, and occasional film director
 DJ Tomekk (born 1975), hip hop DJ and music producer

1976 to 2000 
 Marek Baster (born 1976), football player
  (born 1976), cinematographer
  (born 1976), jazz musician
 Małgosia Bela (born 1977), fashion model and actress
  (born 1977), handball player
 Łukasz Sosin (born 1977), football player
 Łukasz Surma (born 1977), football player
 Magdalena Boczarska (born 1978), actress
 Gromee (born 1978), DJ, remixer, and music producer
 Ludwika Paleta (born 1978), Polish Mexican actress and model
 Joanna Liszowska (born 1978), actress
 Mirosław Spiżak (born 1979), football player
 Mariusz Wach (born 1979), professional boxer
 Piotr Bagnicki (born 1980), football player
 Piotr Giza (born 1980), football player
 Marcin Wasilewski (born 1980), football player
 Maciej Iwański (born 1981), football player
 Władysław Kosiniak-Kamysz (born 1981), physician and politician
 Chris Pozniak (born 1981), football player
 Radosław Zawrotniak (born 1981), fencer
  (born 1983), composer and conductor
 Daria Werbowy (born 1983), fashion model
 Maciej Bębenek (born 1984), football player
  (born 1984), poet, literary critic, and Romance philologist
 Robert Kubica (born 1984), racing driver
 Tomasz Marczyński (born 1984), road racing cyclist
 Piotr Polczak (born 1986), football player
 Michał Pazdan (born 1987), football player
  (born 1988), swimmer
 Agnieszka Radwańska (born 1989), tennis player
 Tomasz Fornal (born 1997), volleyball player
 Jan-Krzysztof Duda (born 1998), chess grandmaster

Notable people with connections to Krakow

Until 1800 
 Stanislaus of Szczepanów (1030–1079), Bishop of Krakow
 Hyacinth of Poland (1183–1257), Dominican priest and missionary
 János Thurzó (1437–1508), entrepreneur and mining engineer
 Nicolaus Cracoviensis (?–1550), composer
 Veit Stoss (Polish: Wit Stwosz; (1447–1553), sculptor
 Jacob Pollak (around 1460–1541), rabbi, founder of Talmudic yeshiva in Krakow
 Nicolaus Copernicus (Polish: Mikołaj Kopernik; 1473–1543), studied here
 Hans von Kulmbach (1480–1522), German artist
 Israel ben Josef (around 1500 – 1568), founder of the Remah Synagogue
 Joshua Höschel ben Joseph (around 1578 – 1648), rabbi
 Yom-Tov Lipmann Heller (around 1579 – 1654), rabbi
 Avraham Yehoshua Heschel (1595–1663), rabbi
 Augustus II (1670–1733), crowned King of Poland in Krakow, Head of State of the Polish-Lithuanian Commonwealth.
  (1685–1745), composer and conductor

After 1801 
 Ludwik Karol Teichmann (1823–1895), anatomist
 Emil Czyrniański (1824–1888), chemist
 Maurycy Gottlieb (1856–1879), Jewish Polish painter
 Stanisław Zaremba (1863–1942), mathematician and engineer 
 Dagny Juel (1867–1901), Norwegian writer
 Józef Piłsudski (1867–1935), Marshal and politician
 Stanisław Przybyszewski (1868–1927), writer
 Ozjasz Thon (1870–1936), rabbi in Krakow, Zionist
 Georg Trakl (1887–1914), expressionist
 Ivo Andric (1892–1975), writer, diplomat, politician, and winner of 1961 Nobel Prize in Literature
  (1857–1940), Imperial and Royal lieutenant field marshal, military commander of Krakow from 1915 to 1918
 Oskar Schindler (1908–1974), entrepreneur
 Czesław Miłosz (1911–2004), poet and winner of 1980 Nobel prize in Literature
 Pope John Paul II (1920–2005), born as Karol Wojtyła in Wadowice, Bishop of Krakow
 Stanisław Lem (1921–2006), philosopher, essayist and science-fiction author
 Wisława Szymborska (1923–2012), poet, essayist, translator, and winner of 1996 Nobel Prize in Literature
  (1928–1995), organist and composer
 Piotr Skrzynecki (1930–1997), founder of the Piwnica pod Baranami cabaret
  (born 1930), former superintendent in Leipzig, honorary citizen of Krakow
 Czesław Olech (1931–2015), mathematician, member of the Kraków School of Mathematics
 Krzysztof Penderecki (1933–2020), composer
 Roman Polański (born 1933), film director, screenwriter, and actor
 Maja Komorowska (born 1937), actress
 Zbigniew Wodecki (1950–2017), singer, musician and composer
  (born 1952), computer scientist and entrepreneur, founder of Comarch
 Nigel Kennedy (born 1956), violinist

See also 

 List of mayors of Kraków
 List of voivodes of Kraków
 Rectors of the Jagiellonian University
 List of universities and colleges in Kraków
 History of Kraków
 List of events in Kraków
 Culture of Kraków
 List of Poles

References 

Kraków
Krakow
People from Kraków